The Benahavis Senior Masters was a golf tournament on the European Senior Tour. It was played at the La Quinta Golf & Country Club near Benahavís, Marbella, Spain. 

The first edition was in 2009. It ended in a playoff between Carl Mason and Gordon Brand Jnr. It was Mason's sixth victory in Spain since 1994. The next week Mason won the Bad Ragaz PGA Seniors Open. That was his 23rd title on the Seniors Tour, equalling the record of Tommy Horton. Mason broke that record when he won in Murcia in May 2011.

The second edition was won by Boonchu Ruangkit by a margin of 7 strokes. Second position was shared by John Gould and Carl Mason. It was Ruangkit's first win in Europe.

In 2011, Gary Wolstenholme held the lead after each of the first two rounds. In the third round, Carl Mason took over, making three birdies on the front nine. It was his 25th win on the Seniors Tour. Mark James and Gary Wolstenholme shared second place, three strokes behind.

Gary Wolstenholme won the 2012 tournament with rounds of 67, 67 and 66. Mark James and Mark Mouland shared second place, a shot behind.

Winners

External links
Coverage on the European Senior Tour's official site

Former European Senior Tour events
Golf tournaments in Spain
Recurring sporting events established in 2009
Recurring sporting events disestablished in 2012